Strange World is an American television program about military investigations into criminal abuses of science and technology.  ABC commissioned 13 episodes, of which three aired in March 1999, before the network cancelled the program. The remaining ten episodes produced subsequently premiered on the Sci-Fi Channel in Spring 2002. The series was created by Howard Gordon and Tim Kring.

In a webchat during the 2002 run on Sci Fi, Gordon stated that, since the producers felt ABC was not going to support the show, the producers had the opportunity to write a conclusion to the story.

Plot

USAMRIID was created in 1970 to counter the threat of chemical and biological weapons.

Section 44 of the charter permits it to investigate criminal abuses of science.

—Text at the beginning of the pilot episode.

Captain Paul Turner (Tim Guinee) is a doctor for The United States Army Medical Research Institute for Infectious Diseases (USAMRIID), who suffers from a rare form of aplastic anemia as a result of exposure to chemical weapons during the Persian Gulf War. USAMRIID lures him out of his sickbed with the opportunity to bring justice to others suffering from unethical uses of science and technology. Unknown to his superiors, he is given a temporary cure for the symptoms of his disease by a mysterious woman who is an agent of a shadowy organization that may be trying to thwart the goals of USAMRIID. He requires periodic doses of the cure to remain functional, a weakness that the shadowy organization occasionally uses to control him. Both the machinations of the "shadowy organization" and Turner's dependency on the "cure" are ultimately resolved in the final episode of the series.

Cast
 Tim Guinee as Captain Paul Turner
 Kristin Lehman as Dr. Sidney MacMillan
 Saundra Quarterman as Major Lynne Reese

Title sequence
The opening-title sequence was added to the permanent collection of the American Institute of Graphic Arts in 1999.  It was created by Imaginary Forces.

Episodes

See also
Doomwatch
Fringe

References

External links 

 

American Broadcasting Company original programming
1990s American medical television series
American military television series
1999 American television series debuts
1999 American television series endings
1990s American science fiction television series
Television series by 20th Century Fox Television
Television shows filmed in Vancouver
Television series created by Tim Kring